The 1952 Pittsburgh Steelers season was the franchise's 20th in the National Football League they finished the season with a 5–7 record under head coach Joe Bach, who returned to the organization replacing John Michelosen.

The season was notable in that it was the last year the Steelers used the single-wing formation on offense, switching to the T formation the following year. The Steelers were the last NFL team to use the single-wing as their primary offensive formation.

Regular season

Schedule

Game summaries

Week 1 (Sunday September 28, 1952): Philadelphia Eagles 

at Forbes Field, Pittsburgh, Pennsylvania

 Game time: 
 Game weather: 
 Game attendance: 22,501
 Referee: 
 TV announcers:

Scoring drives:

 Philadelphia – Grant 84 pass from Burk (Walston kick)
 Philadelphia – Ziegler 4 pass from Burk (Walston kick)
 Pittsburgh – Finks 20 run (kick blocked)
 Philadelphia – FG Walston 32
 Pittsburgh – Modzelewski 1 run (kick blocked)
 Philadelphia – Ziegler 3 run (Walston kick)
 Pittsburgh – Finks 1 run (Kerkorian kick)
 Philadelphia – Pihos 25 pass from Burk (Walston kick)
 Pittsburgh – Mathews 27 pass from Finks (kick blocked)

Week 2 (Saturday October 4, 1952): Cleveland Browns 

at Forbes Field, Pittsburgh, Pennsylvania

 Game time: 
 Game weather: 
 Game attendance: 27,923
 Referee: 
 TV announcers:

Scoring drives:

 Pittsburgh – Nickel 10 pass from Finks (kick failed)
 Cleveland – Motley 68 pass from Graham (Groza kick)
 Pittsburgh – Nickel 30 pass from Finks (Kerkorian kick)
 Pittsburgh – Finks 1 run (Kerkorian kick)
 Cleveland – Jones 17 pass from Graham (Groza kick)
 Cleveland – Howard 57 pass from Graham (Groza kick)

Week 3 (Sunday October 12, 1952): Philadelphia Eagles 

at Shibe Park, Philadelphia, Pennsylvania

 Game time: 
 Game weather: 
 Game attendance: 18,648
 Referee: 
 TV announcers:

'Scoring drives:

 Philadelphia – FG Walston 25
 Philadelphia – FG Walston 20
 Pittsburgh – Chandnois 93 kick return (Kerkorian kick)
 Philadelphia – Brewer 1 run (Walston kick)
 Pittsburgh – Mathews 25 pass from Finks (Kerkorian kick)
 Pittsburgh – Nickel 54 pass from Finks (Kerkorian kick)
 Philadelphia – Grant 17 pass from Enke (Walston kick)
 Philadelphia – FG Walston 24
 Philadelphia – FG Walston 19

Week 4 (Sunday October 19, 1952): Washington Redskins 

at Forbes Field, Pittsburgh, Pennsylvania

 Game time: 
 Game weather: 
 Game attendance: 22,605
 Referee: 
 TV announcers:

Scoring drives:

 Washington – Williams 62 punt return (LeBaron kick)
 Washington – Heath 1 run (LeBaron kick)
 Pittsburgh – Nickel 6 pass from Finks (Kerkorian kick)
 Pittsburgh – FG Kerkorian 36
 Pittsburgh – Hays 1 interception (Kerkorian kick)
 Washington – Taylor 11 pass from Gilmer (LeBaron kick)
 Pittsburgh – Nickel 36 pass from Finks (Kerkorian kick)
 Washington – Taylor 43 pass from LeBaron (LeBaron kick)

Week 5 (Sunday October 26, 1952): Chicago Cardinals 

at Comiskey Park, Chicago, Illinois

 Game time: 
 Game weather: 
 Game attendance: 20,395
 Referee: 
 TV announcers:

Scoring drives:

 Pittsburgh – Chandnois 28 pass from Finks (Kerkorian kick)
 Pittsburgh – Mathews 70 punt return (kick blocked)
 Pittsburgh – Nickel 5 pass from Finks (Kerkorian kick)
 Pittsburgh – Sulima 13 pass from Finks (Kerkorian kick)
 Chicago Cardinals – Matson 33 pass from Panciera (Geri kick)
 Pittsburgh – Ferry 71 fumble run (Kerkorian kick)
 Chicago Cardinals – Matson 41 pass from Panciera (Geri kick)
 Chicago Cardinals – Matson 47 pass from Panciera (Geri kick)
 Chicago Cardinals – Cross 4 run (Geri kick)

Week 6 (Sunday November 2, 1952): Washington Redskins 

at Griffith Stadium, Washington, DC

 Game time: 
 Game weather: 
 Game attendance: 25,866
 Referee: 
 TV announcers:

Scoring Drives:

 Pittsburgh – Dodrill 35 blocked field goal return (Kerkorian kick)
 Washington – LeBaron 2 run (Rykovich kick)
 Pittsburgh – FG Kerkorian 23
 Pittsburgh – Mathews 70 punt return (Kerkorian kick)
 Pittsburgh – Rogel 1 run (Kerkorian kick)
 Washington – Safety, Finks tackled in end zone by Hennessey
 Washington – Taylor 40 pass from LeBaron (LeBaron kick)
 Washington – Justice 13 pass from LeBaron (Buksar kick)

Week 7 (Sunday November 9, 1952): Detroit Lions 

at Forbes Field, Pittsburgh, Pennsylvania

 Game time: 
 Game weather: 
 Game attendance: 26,170
 Referee: 
 TV announcers:

Scoring drives:

 Detroit – FG Walker 16
 Detroit – Girard 1 run (Walker kick)
 Detroit – Box 46 pass from Layne (Walker kick)
 Pittsburgh – Rogel 3 run (kick failed)
 Detroit – Girard 31 run (Walker kick)
 Detroit – Bailey 9 run (Layne kick)

Week 8 (Sunday November 16, 1952): Cleveland Browns 

at Cleveland Municipal Stadium, Cleveland, Ohio

 Game time: 
 Game weather: 
 Game attendance: 34,973
 Referee: 
 TV announcers:

Scoring drives:

 Cleveland – Lavelli 22 pass from Graham (Groza kick)
 Cleveland – Safety, Finks tackled in end zone by Young
 Cleveland – FG Groza 11
 Cleveland – FG Groza 34
 Cleveland – Lavelli 22 pass from Graham (Groza kick)
 Pittsburgh – Mathews 33 pass from Finks (Kerkorian kick)
 Pittsburgh – Butler 7 pass from Finks (Kerkorian kick)
 Cleveland – Graham 2 run (Groza kick)
 Pittsburgh – Mathews 38 pass from Finks (Kerkorian kick)
 Pittsburgh – Nickel 9 pass from Finks (Kerkorian kick)

Week 9 (Sunday November 23, 1952): Chicago Cardinals 

at Forbes Field, Pittsburgh, Pennsylvania

 Game time: 
 Game weather: 
 Game attendance: 18,330
 Referee: 
 TV announcers:

Scoring drives:

 Pittsburgh – FG Kerkorian 23
 PIttsburgh – Modzelewski 6 run (Kerkorian kick)
 Chicago Cardinals – Paul 9 pass from Panciera (Geri kick)
 Pittsburgh – Finks 1 run (Kerkorian kick)
 Chicago Cardinals – Cross 38 pass from Panciera (Geri kick)

Week 10 (Sunday November 30, 1952): New York Giants 

at Forbes Field, Pittsburgh, Pennsylvania

 Game time: 
 Game weather: 
 Game attendance: 15,140
 Referee: 
 TV announcers:

Scoring drives:

 Pittsburgh – Chandnois 91 kick return (Kerkorian kick)
 Pittsburgh – Chandnois 5 run (Kerkorian kick)
 Pittsburgh – Nickel 21 pass from Finks (Kerkorian kick)
 Pittsburgh – Mathews 42 pass from Finks (Kerkorian kick)
 Pittsburgh – Hensley 25 pass from Finks (Kerkorian kick)
 New York Giants – Stribling 55 lateral from Scott after 15 pass from Landry (Poole kick)
 Pittsburgh – Hensley 60 pass from Finks (Kerkorian kick)
 Pittsburgh – George Hays 3 run with blocked punt (Mathews kick)
 Pittsburgh – Butler 20 pass from Kerkorian (Kerkorian kick)
 Pittsburgh – Modzelewski 3 run (Kerkorian kick

Notes: Tom Landry was brought in as a 3rd string quarterback for New York to complete the game for the entire 2nd half.

Week 11 (Sunday December 7, 1952): San Francisco 49ers 

at Kezar Stadium, San Francisco, California

 Game time: 
 Game weather: 
 Game attendance: 13,886
 Referee: 
 TV announcers:

Scoring drives:

 Pittsburgh – Rogel 3 run (Kerkorian kick)
 San Francisco – Soltau 6 pass from Albert (Soltau kick)
 Pittsburgh – FG Kerkorian 19
 Pittsburgh – Finks 1 run (Kerkorian kick)
 Pittsburgh – Chandnois 48 pass from Finks (Kerkorian kick)

Week 12 (Sunday December 14, 1952): Los Angeles Rams 

at Los Angeles Memorial Coliseum, Los Angeles, California

 Game time: 
 Game weather: 
 Game attendance: 71,130
 Referee: 
 TV announcers:

Scoring drives:

 Los Angeles – Fears 10 pass from Van Brocklin (Waterfield kick)
 Los Angeles – Lane 42 interception return (Waterfield kick)
 Pittsburgh – Hogan 15 interception return (Kerkorian kick)
 Pittsburgh – Nickel 13 pass from Finks (Kerkorian kick)
 Los Angeles – Hirsch 65 pass from Van Brocklin (Waterfield kick)
 Los Angeles – Fears 5 pass from Van Brocklin (Waterfield kick)

Standings

References

External links

 1952 Pittsburgh Steelers season, YouTube.com/

Pittsburgh Steelers seasons
Pittsburgh Steelers
Pitts